The Independent Paralympic Athletes Team, a team consisting of refugee and asylee Paralympic athletes, competed at the 2016 Summer Paralympics in Rio de Janeiro, Brazil, from 7 September to 18 September 2016. Its creation was announced on 5 August 2016.

Participation 
The team was announced on August 5, 2016, by the International Paralympic Committee. Participants were nominated for the team by National Paralympic Committees who were aware of qualified sportspeople. The International Paralympic Committee stepped in to assist with getting athletes ready by doing a number of things, including insuring that athletes were classified.

On 26 August 2016, the IPC announced the two members of the refugee team: Ibrahim Al Hussein of Syria, who will compete in the S10 50 and 100 m freestyle swimming events, and Shahrad Nasajpour of Iran, who will compete in F37 Discus. Tony Sainsbury was the chef de mission of the team; Sainsbury has previously been the chef de mission of the British Paralympic Team at five Paralympics.

The team was considered a success and it was recreated as the Refugee Paralympic Team at the 2020 Summer Paralympics and both of the athletes in this team returned in 2020.

Disability classifications 

Every participant at the Paralympics has their disability grouped into one of five disability categories; amputation, the condition may be congenital or sustained through injury or illness; cerebral palsy; wheelchair athletes, there is often overlap between this and other categories; visual impairment, including blindness; Les autres, any physical disability that does not fall strictly under one of the other categories, for example dwarfism or multiple sclerosis. Each Paralympic sport then has its own classifications, dependent upon the specific physical demands of competition. Events are given a code, made of numbers and letters, describing the type of event and classification of the athletes competing. Some sports, such as athletics, divide athletes by both the category and severity of their disabilities, other sports, for example swimming, group competitors from different categories together, the only separation being based on the severity of the disability.

Athletics

Swimming

See also 
 Refugee Olympic Team at the 2016 Summer Olympics

References 

Refugees in South America
Nations at the 2016 Summer Paralympics
Independent Paralympians at the Paralympic Games